is a 2006 Japanese mystery film directed by Kiyoshi Kurosawa, starring Kōji Yakusho, of a detective's investigation of serial murders that leads him to a mysterious woman in red who slowly draws him into the darkness.

Plot
Yoshioka, an experienced detective, investigates the murder of an unknown woman in a red dress. She was drowned on the Tokyo waterfront, but an autopsy reveals that her stomach is full of seawater. Moreover, all the clues he finds relate to himself: A button found at the murder scene matches one that is missing from his own coat, and fingerprints found match his own. Yoshioka realizes that the only viable suspect is himself; but he doesn't remember a thing.

A ghost in a red dress soon starts appearing to him. As these apparitions become more intense and bizarre, similar murders occur with people killing loved ones for small infractions. All the perpetrators are found by Yoshioka as he searches for clues about the original murder. Eventually the drowned woman is identified. Yoshioka visits her parents, only to find she had a boyfriend who was extorting her parents, who happens to visit the house at the same time. He quickly confesses to the crime.

Yoshioka is visited by the ghost again who reveals that she is not the murdered woman, but a ghost of a woman whom he saw in the window of an asylum fifteen years ago who has died. All of the murderers took the ferry past the same asylum. Yoshioka sends his girlfriend away, afraid of what he might do to her. He goes to the asylum, where the woman in red agrees to forgive him for not helping her 15 years ago.  He goes home, only to discover that he murdered his girlfriend 6 months ago. Going insane, he tries to forget. He collects the bones, and goes to the asylum to pick up the ghost's bones. His partner arrives at his apartment and finds the empty bowl Yoshioka used to commit the murder. The ghost stalks him in the background. As an earthquake occurs, the bowl is now filled with water. The ghost suddenly appears above him and dives down dragging them both into the bowl. The film ends with Yoshioka walking in the street holding a bag containing his girlfriend's and the ghost's bones, with the ghost repeatedly saying: "I am dead. So please, I want everyone to die too".

Cast
 Kōji Yakusho – Noboru Yoshioka
 Manami Konishi – Harue Nimura
 Riona Hazuki – F18
 Tsuyoshi Ihara – Toru Miyaji
 Joe Odagiri – Dr. Takagi
 Ryo Kase - Sailor
 Hiroyuki Hirayama – Young detective Sakurai
 Ikuji Nakamura - Shoichi Sakuma
 Kaoru Okunuki - Miyuki Yabe
 Hironobu Nomura - Seiji Onoda

Release 
The film was released as part of producer Takashige Ichise's J-Horror Theater series along with Infection, Premonition, and Reincarnation, among others.

Reception
Adam DiLeo of IGN gave Retribution a mixed review, saying that the films is worth seeing despite it is not on par with Kiyoshi Kurosawa's previous films such as Cure and Bright Future. Derek Elley of Variety praised Kōji Yakusho's performance, saying he "makes an ideal protagonist, one with whom the audience is never quite sure whether it can identify".

As the ghost of the film, is seeking revenge from past events of which every protagonist is apparently responsible, the horror in Retribution has been seen by some as expressing some kind of social illness and collective guilt in our contemporary world.

References

External links
 
 
 

2006 films
2000s crime films
2000s mystery films
2006 psychological thriller films
Films directed by Kiyoshi Kurosawa
2000s ghost films
Japanese mystery films
Japanese thriller films
J-Horror Theater
Fiction about murder
Japanese crime films
Japanese supernatural horror films
Japanese ghost films
2000s Japanese films